The Motorola Edge (2021) is an Android smartphone developed by Motorola Mobility, a subsidiary of Lenovo.

References

External links 
 

Mobile phones introduced in 2021
Android (operating system) devices
Motorola smartphones
Mobile phones with multiple rear cameras
Mobile phones with 4K video recording